A clog is a shoe with a rigid, often wooden, sole.

Clog may also refer to:
 Clog (British), a wooden-soled clog from Great Britain
 C.L.O.G., a clogging organization
 Clogs (band), an Australian music group
 Clog, a blockage in plumbing 
 Clog, a British brand of rock-climbing equipment owned by Wild Country (company) 
 "Clogs", an episode of the television series Teletubbies
 C-Log, a proprietary log profile by Canon, Inc.

See also
 Clog-dancing, a traditional dance from the North of England 
 Clogging, a traditional type of percussive folk dance in the United States
 Clogging (craft), the construction of Clogs
 Clock (disambiguation)
 Cloqué